Honest Boyz (stylized in all caps)also HONEST BOYZ®, is a 5-member hip hop group consisting of four MC's and one DJ: Naoto (Exile member & Sandaime J Soul Brothers leader), Verbal (from m-flo and PKCZ®), Sway (from Doberman Infinity & Gekidan Exile), Mandy (from Exile & Generations) and Nigo.

The group was formed in 2016 and is managed by LDH under the label LDH Music.

Overview 
This group made their debut with "Part Time Hero", a theme song of TV drama "Night Hero Naoto" starring Naoto. Their second single "YO!" had been selected as an interlude of the movie "High & Low The Movie 2 / End Of Sky". These 2 songs both took up the 1st place on iTunes Songs Chart.

On April 17, 2019, it was announced that the unit will make its world debut with the new song "Electricity featuring Lil Uzi Vert" which was selected as the ending song of Hollywood's live-action movie "Pokémon Detective Pikachu" for both "the original movie" and "the Japanese version", the song is produced by Pharrell Williams and features rapper Lil Uzi Vert and is scheduled to be released under a major overseas label.

Members

Discography

Digital Singles

Singles

Music Videos

Tie-up

Notes

References

External links 

 HONEST BOYZ Official Website

2016 establishments in Japan
Japanese boy bands
Japanese hip hop groups
Musical groups established in 2016
LDH (company) artists